Peptoniphilus stercorisuis is a Gram-positive and anaerobic bacterium from the genus of Peptoniphilus which has been isolated from a swine manure storage tank from Oklahoma in the United States.

References 

Bacteria described in 2014
Eubacteriales